K20HZ was a low-power television station in Palm Springs, California, broadcasting locally on channel 20 as an affiliate of HSN. Founded March 16, 2007, the station was owned by Howard Mintz.

K20HZ was an affiliate of LAT TV until the network's shutdown in 2008. In July 2009, K20HZ became "KMXX" (the call sign "MXX" as in "Mexico" and the Roman numeral for 20) to include Spanish-language programs like it had before. It remained a part-time schedule TV station and was not available on cable.

In June 2013, K20HZ was slated to be sold to Landover 5 LLC as part of a larger deal involving 51 other low-power television stations; the sale fell through in June 2016.

K20HZ went dark December 27, 2013, stating that it was in the process of converting to digital television. The station's license was cancelled on November 17, 2015.

References

External links 

20HZ
Television channels and stations established in 2007
2007 establishments in California
Television channels and stations disestablished in 2015
2015 disestablishments in California
Defunct television stations in the United States
20HZ